Kids World or Kid's World may refer to:
 Kid's World, a former themed area at the Dreamworld theme park, Gold Coast, Australia
 Kid's World (amusement park), Long Branch, New Jersey, USA
 KidsWorld, a Canadian magazine
 Kids World (film), a 2001 children's film

See also
Children's World (disambiguation)
Child World, an American chain of toy stores